Tim is the fourth studio album by American alternative rock band The Replacements. It was released in October 1985 on Sire Records. It was their first major label release and also the last album made by the original line-up of the band: guitarist Bob Stinson was kicked out of the band towards the end of 1986.

Like its predecessors, Tim achieved moderate mainstream commercial success despite critical acclaim. The album peaked at number 183 on the Billboard Music Chart's Top 200. It was placed 136th on Rolling Stone's 2003 list of the 500 greatest albums of all time, and 137 in a 2012 revised list. It ranked 4th in the Alternative Press list of the Top 99 albums of 1985–1995. Along with the band's previous album, Let It Be, Tim received five stars from AllMusic. In 2014, the staff of PopMatters included the album on their list of "12 Essential Alternative Rock Albums from the 1980s".

Bob Stinson is the only member of the band whose face is clearly visible on the cover.

Songs
Stylistically, the album shows Paul Westerberg's diverse influences, including Alex Chilton's Big Star on "Hold My Life," Roy Orbison and Duane Eddy on "Swingin Party" and Nick Lowe on "Kiss Me on the Bus."  The song "Can't Hardly Wait" was originally recorded for Tim, but was not included in the release. It appears later on Pleased to Meet Me with one of the original guitar parts changed to a horn part.

The album also contains the song "Bastards of Young," which was given a now-infamous black-and-white video, consisting mostly of a single unbroken shot of a speaker. At the end of the song, the speaker is kicked in by the person who was listening to the song. Similar videos were also made for "Hold My Life" (in color), "Left of the Dial" (minus the speaker-bashing), and "Little Mascara" (also in color).

"Left of the Dial" is a reference to college radio stations, which were usually on the left side of a radio dial. More than 20 years after the album's release, the song remains popular as a college radio anthem.

The band performed "Bastards of Young" and "Kiss Me on the Bus" on Saturday Night Live on January 18, 1986. It was the most television exposure the band had received up to that time, but the band's behavior on the show, including swearing during the broadcast, resulted in a lifetime ban from Saturday Night Live.  However, Westerberg would later perform on the show as a solo artist.

The song "Here Comes a Regular" was written about south Minneapolis bar CC Club, a frequent hangout for the band across the street from record store Oar Folkjokeopus, an important center for the Minneapolis music scene.

"Bastards of Young" was used in the 2020 film The New Mutants during the "party" scene where they are relaxing even though they are still confined.

Reissue
The album was remastered and reissued by Rhino Entertainment on September 23, 2008 with six additional tracks and liner notes by Peter Jesperson.

Reception

Like its predecessor, Let It Be, Tim was highly praised by critics upon its release. The album is frequently included on professional lists of the all-time best rock albums. Tim was ranked at number four in Alternative Press list of the Top 99 albums of 1985–1995. Along with their previous album, Let It Be, Tim received five stars from AllMusic.

The album was placed 136th on Rolling Stone's 2003 list of the 500 greatest albums of all time, with the following review:

{{cquote|Singer-guitarist Paul Westerberg once cited Tim'''s stylistic bookends to describe both the longevity of the Replacements' influence and their lack of mainstream success. "My style is ultimately both kinds of things," he said. "Sometimes you just love the little acoustic songs, and other times you want to crank the goddamn amp up, and those two parts of me are forever entwined." That cognitive dissonance – the Stonesesque swagger of "Bastards of Young," the unpolished reflection in "Swingin Party" — became a crucial template for grunge, alternative country and, recently, the noisy introspection of emo.}}Pitchfork ranked Tim at number 37 on their list of the Top 100 Albums of the 1980s. Slant Magazine'' listed the album at number 66 on its list of "Best Albums of the 1980s".

Track listing

Tracks 12 and 14–17 were previously unreleased.
Tracks 12–14 are session outtakes with Alex Chilton as producer.

Personnel
The Replacements
Paul Westerberg	 – 	guitar, piano, vocals
Chris Mars	 – 	drums, backing vocals
Bob Stinson	 – 	guitar
Tommy Stinson	 – 	bass
with:
Alex Chilton	 – 	additional production, vocals on "Left of the Dial"
Tommy Erdelyi	 – 	producer, guitar solo on "Kiss Me on the Bus"
Technical
Steven Fjelstad	 – 	producer, engineer
Jack Skinner	 – 	mastering
Robert Longo	 – 	artwork

References

External links
Album online on Radio3Net a radio channel of Romanian Radio Broadcasting Company

1985 albums
The Replacements (band) albums
Sire Records albums
Albums produced by Tommy Ramone